The Basilica of St Peter and St Paul is a Roman Catholic minor basilica and parish church located in Nadur, Gozo in Malta.

History
The parish of Nadur was established by the Bishop of Malta Davide Cocco Palmieri on 28 April 1688. The Immaculate Conception church in Qala served the spiritual needs of the parish until the parish church was constructed. The construction of the present church was started on 28 September 1760 and the design is attributed to the Maltese architect Giuseppe Bonici. Construction on the church finished on 12 May 1867. The third Collegiate chapter of Gozo was established on 19 September 1894.

This church is one of the most beautiful churches on the island. In 1907, a refurbishment programme took place to construct the aisles, dome and façade based on the Italian Renaissance design of Prof. F.S. Sciortino. The ceiling, depicting episodes connected with St Peter and Paul, was painted by the Maltese artist Lazzaro Pisani, while the architectural decorations are the work of the Italian Pio Cellini. Principal force behind all these new projects was Archpriest Martin Camilleri. The church became a minor Basilica on 26 June 1967.

References

Basilica churches in Malta
Collegiate churches in Malta
Nadur
1670 establishments in Malta
17th-century Roman Catholic church buildings in Malta
Baroque church buildings in Malta
Church buildings with domes
National Inventory of the Cultural Property of the Maltese Islands